Dreissenoidea is a superfamily of brackish water and freshwater false mussels, aquatic bivalve molluscs in the order Myida.

Families
Families within the superfamily Dreisseniodea include:
Dreissenidae

References

 WoRMS info page

Venerida
Mollusc superfamilies
Monotypic protostome taxa